Therkathi Veeran is a 2022 Indian Tamil-language action drama film directed by Saarath and starring himself in the lead role, alongside Anagha, Ashok Kumar and Kabir Duhan Singh. It was released on 2 December 2022.

Cast

Saarath
Anagha
Ashok Kumar
Kabir Duhan Singh
Vela Ramamoorthy
Madhusudhan Rao
Pawan
Bharani
Namo Narayana
R. N. R. Manohar
Kalloori Vinoth
Renuka
Uma Padmanabhan
Rajasimman
Aryan
Poovaiyar
Prasanna Sujit in a guest appearance
Srikanth Deva in a guest appearance
Sandy in a guest appearance

Production
The film marked the acting and directing debut of Saarath, the grandson of former Tamil actor J. P. Chandrababu. Saarath revealed that he wrote the story based on a compilation of incidents that had taken place in Thoothukudi. Srikanth Deva was approached to portray the antagonist in the film, but turned down the offer and worked as the music composer.

Soundtrack
Soundtrack was composed by Srikanth Deva.
Kadalamma - Deva, Poovaiyar
Enna Thavam - Sathyaprakash, Priyanka
Unna Paarkatha - Srinisha Jayaseelan
Therkathi Veera - Pooja Vaidyanath
Varamaaga - Saarath

Reception
The film was released on 2 December 2022 across Tamil Nadu. A critic from Maalai Malar gave the film 2 out of 5 stars, and labelled the film as a "failure". A reviewer from Dina Thanthi also gave the film an unfavourable review.

References

2022 films
2020s Tamil-language films